Seruvakula is a surname. Notable people with the surname include:

Semi Seruvakula (died 2018), Fijian chief and politician
Viliame Seruvakula, Fijian military officer